The Rocketdyne XRS-2200 was an experimental linear aerospike engine developed in the mid-1990s for the Lockheed Martin X-33 program. The design was based on the J-2S, the upgraded version of the Apollo era J-2 engine developed in the 1960s. The XRS-2200 used the J-2's combustion cycle and propellant choice.

Rocketdyne intended to develop the subscale XRS-2200 into the RS-2200 for use on the VentureStar. While the X-33 program was cancelled, two XRS-2200 engines were produced and tested.

References

Rocketdyne engines
Rocketdyne
Rocket engines